André Bloch may refer to:

André Bloch (composer) (1873–1960), French composer
André Bloch (mathematician) (1893–1948), French mathematician